Montferrand may refer to:

Places
 Montferrand, a crusader fortress near present-day Baarin, Syria
 Montferrand, Puy-de-Dôme, a former town, now part of Clermont-Ferrand, France
 Montferrand, Aude, a commune in the department of Aude, France
 Montferrand-du-Périgord, a commune in the department of Dordogne, France
 Montferrand-la-Fare, a commune in the department of Drôme, France
 Montferrand-le-Château, a commune in the department of Doubs, France

People
 Auguste de Montferrand (1786–1858), French neoclassical architect
 Hadrien de Montferrand (born 1976), French specialist in Chinese contemporary art
 Jos Montferrand (1802–1864), French-Canadian logger and strongman

Other uses
 ASM Clermont Auvergne, a rugby union club based in Clermont-Ferrand, France